Arthur Windsor (1832–1913) was an Australian journalist.

Arthur Windsor may also refer to:

Prince Arthur, Duke of Connaught and Strathearn (1850–1942), third son of Queen Victoria of the United Kingdom
Prince Arthur of Connaught (1883–1938), the only son of the above Prince Arthur